Bolesław Michał Rusiecki ((23 November 1824, Rome — 31 January 1913, Vilnius) was a Polish-Lithuanian painter and art collector.

Biography 
Rusiecki was initially a student at the  "Wileński Instytut Szlachecki" (institute for the nobility), then studied medicine at the University of Saint Petersburg. His father was the painter, Kanuty Rusiecki. From 1843 to 1850, he audited classes at the Imperial Academy of Fine Arts, taught by Karl Bryullov and Fyodor Bruni. Upon completing them, he was awarded the title of "Free Artist". He was named an Academician in 1853 for his allegorical painting, "Połączenie Willi z Niemnem“ (The Confluence of the Viliya into the Neman)

In 1857, he and his wife Stefania, née Karpowicz, went on an extended trip abroad; visiting several cities in Poland, as well as Dresden, Prague, vienna and Trieste. From 1858 to 1861, they lived in Rome. Upon returning, they settled at the family estate near Bialystok, but after Stefanija's death in 1866, at the age of only thirty-seven, he moved into Vilnius and taught drawing at the gymnasium. During this period, he created several religious paintings; notably an image of Saint Stanislaus, for Vilnius Cathedral, and one of Saint Casimir, for St. Francis Xavier Cathedral, Grodno. Most of his works were portraits or landscapes.

He was also a collector of art and related materials, including archaeological artefacts. In addition, he became a member of a committee devoted to creating a monument for the writer and poet, Adam Mickiewicz. The monument itself was designed by the architect, and it was installed in 1898, at the Church of St. Johns, Vilnius. The project had been met with opposition, despite having been suggested by Mickiewicz's son, and it was dedicated without a ceremony in 1899.

Toward the end of his life, he bequeathed his art collection, archives and library to the Society of the Friends of Science, and donated 10,000 Rubles for the construction of a building to house them. His works may be seen at the Lithuanian National Museum of Art, the National Museum, Kraków, and the National Museum, Warsaw.

References

Further reading 
 Biography of Rusiecki by P. Stolpyanski, from the Russian Biographical Dictionary @ Russian WikiSource

External links 

 "Paintings by the artist Boleslaw Mykolas Ruseckas from the collections of the Lithuanian Art Museum" @ Parodas

1824 births
1913 deaths
Lithuanian painters
Lithuanian people of Polish descent
Lithuanian portrait painters
Religious artists
People from Rome
Artists from Vilnius